Churtanbashevo (Surtanbaş) is a rural locality (a village) in Chekmagushevsky District, Bashkortostan, Russia. The population was 55 as of 2010. There are 2 streets.

Geography 
Churtanbashevo  is located 21 km north of Chekmagush (the district's administrative centre) by road. Syryshbashevo is the nearest rural locality.

References 

Rural localities in Chekmagushevsky District